The ARIA Singles Chart ranks the best-performing singles in Australia. Its data, published by the Australian Recording Industry Association, is based collectively on each single's weekly physical and digital sales. In 2006, 14 singles claimed the top spot, including Lee Harding's "Wasabi"/"Eye of the Tiger", which started its peak position in late 2005.

Thirteen acts achieved their first number-one single in Australia, either as a lead or featured artist: Chris Brown, Bob Sinclar, Gary Pine, TV Rock, Seany B, Youth Group, Rihanna, Wyclef Jean, Sandi Thom, Green Day, Scissor Sisters, Damien Leith and Beyoncé. Five collaborations topped the chart. Thom's "I Wish I Was a Punk Rocker (With Flowers in My Hair)" was the longest-running number-one single of 2006, having topped the ARIA Singles Chart for ten consecutive weeks. Shakira's "Hips Don't Lie" topped the chart for nine consecutive weeks, Rihanna's "SOS" stayed at number-one for eight consecutive weeks, TV Rock's "Flaunt It" stayed at number-one for five weeks and Leith spent four weeks at number-one with "Night of My Life".

Chart history

Number-one artists

See also
2006 in music
List of number-one albums of 2006 (Australia)

References

2006 in Australian music
Australia Singles
2006